Roger Coleman may refer to:
 Roger Keith Coleman (1958–1992), American convict executed for murder
 Roger Coleman (professor) (born 1943), British academic advancing universal design